Tang-e Loreh is a village in Hemmatabad Rural District, in the Central District of Borujerd County, Lorestan Province, Iran. At the 2006 census, its population was 145, in 32 families.

References 

Towns and villages in Borujerd County